Al Ayyam is a Yemeni daily newspaper published in Arabic.

History and profile
Al Ayyam was founded in 1958. The founder was Mohammad Bashraheel. The paper was shut down after South Yemen became independent under a Marxist regime in 1967. Bashraheel's son Hisham resumed publication in 1990 after the unification of North and South Yemen.

The paper's compound in Sanaa had been the subject of an attack by a dozen gunmen in February 2008. Based in Aden, it was the most widely read newspaper in southern Yemen, when it was one of seven newspapers closed in May 2009, with the government accusing the paper of supporting separatism. It reappeared in May 2014 after a five-year halt.

See also
 Yemeni unification

External links 

 Official site in Arabic

References

Establishments in the Kingdom of Yemen
Publications established in 1958
Newspapers published in Yemen
Arabic-language newspapers
Mass media in Aden
1958 establishments in Asia